Ishavsbyen Fotballklubb is a Norwegian association football club from Tromsdalen, Troms.

The club was founded in 1993. The men's football team won promotion to the 3. divisjon, the fourth tier of Norwegian football, in 1999. After two seasons the club was relegated in 2001, but returned in 2003 and has played there since.

Football clubs in Norway
Association football clubs established in 1993
Sport in Tromsø
1993 establishments in Norway